Obongsan  is a mountain of Gyeongsangbuk-do, eastern South Korea. It has an elevation of 235 metres.

See also
List of mountains of Korea

References

Mountains of South Korea
Mountains of North Gyeongsang Province
Sangju
Mountains under 1000 metres